Le Blé en herbe (English title: The Game of Love) is a 1954 French film by Claude Autant-Lara based on the 1923 novel of the same name by French novelist Colette. The film stars Edwige Feuillère, Pierre-Michel Beck (as Philippe), Nicole Berger (as Vinca Ferret), Robert Berri and Louis de Funès. It is black and white with a monaural soundtrack.

Plot
The plot involves the relationship between a young man and an older woman, or in one critic's summary, "an older woman ... introduces a teenager ... to the mysteries of love".

Marketing
Promotional materials for the film presented it as "the story of two adolescents' love affair and its interruption by an older woman" and called attention to the controversy the film had generated in France. Feuillère was born in 1907, Beck in 1938.

Awards
The film was awarded the 1954

Controversy
In the United States it was subject to a series of attempts to prevent its screening. It received a Class C or "condemned" rating from the Roman Catholic National Legion of Decency. The film was banned in Massachusetts until a court ruling in July 1955 considering the case of Miss Julie, a 1951 Swedish film, held the state's motion picture censorship law unconstitutional. Boston officials were unable to ban it but termed it "unwholesomely immoral". A similar ban in Baltimore was overturned by a Maryland court. The film's distributors sued unsuccessfully in federal court to overturn Chicago's ban. Eleven of the twelve jurors who viewed the film with U.S. District Court Judge Joseph Sam Perry supported his assessment that the film was "immoral and obscene". After the Court of Appeals upheld that ruling, the distributors, the Times Film Corporation, appealed to the U.S. Supreme Court, which ruled in November 1957 that the film did not meet the standard the Court used for determining obscenity, that is, appealing to prurient interest. The justices viewed the film and upheld Chicago's obscenity statute but objected to its application to this film.

Notes
The literal translation of the French title is Ripening Wheat.

See also
 Times Film Corporation v. City of Chicago

References

External links

1954 films
1950s French-language films
Films with screenplays by Jean Aurenche
Films with screenplays by Pierre Bost
1954 drama films
French drama films
Films directed by Claude Autant-Lara
Films based on French novels
Films based on works by Colette
Films about virginity
French black-and-white films
1950s French films